Bert James (1914–2006), Albert James, was an Australian politician.

Bert James may also refer to:

Bert James (baseball) (1886–1959), American baseball player
Bert James (footballer) (1923–1991), Australian footballer

See also
Robert James (disambiguation)
Herbert James (disambiguation)
Bertram James (disambiguation)